Bringin' It is a studio album by American jazz bassist Christian McBride together with his big band. The record was released on September 22, 2017 via the Mack Avenue label—both on CD and on LP. After The Good Feeling, this is his second album as a big band leader and his fourteenth overall. The album consists of 11 tracks: a mix of his own compositions and famous jazz standards, including a version of "Mr. Bojangles" featuring his wife, vocalist Melissa Walker. The album opens with the song "Gettin’ to It", which is the title of his 1994 debut album.

Awards
Bringin' It won the Grammy Award for Best Large Jazz Ensemble Album at the 60th Annual Grammy Awards in 2018.

Critical reception
Matt Collar of AllMusic wrote "Christian McBride's second big-band album, 2017's Bringin' It, is a robust, swaggeringly performed set of originals and standards showcasing his deft arranging skills and his ensemble's exuberant virtuosity. The album comes six years after his previous big-band outing, The Good Feeling, and once again finds the bassist conscripting a slew of his talented cohorts (some new, others returning), including saxophonists Steve Wilson and Ron Blake, trumpeters Freddie Hendrix and Brandon Lee, trombonist Steve Davis, pianist Xavier Davis, drummer Quincy Phillips, and others... With Bringin' It, McBride has ultimately crafted a big-band album that retains all of his own formidable, exuberant characteristics."

Dan Bilawsky of All About Jazz said "This album serves as the long-awaited follow-up to The Good Feeling, the group's Grammy-winning debut. And like its lauded predecessor, Bringin' It presents a tight and tasty program of music designed by McBride and bolstered by his bass. Everything you've come to expect from this musical dynamo—taste, punch, humor, intelligence, solid gold grooves, an appreciation for lyricism—is here for the taking. Styles and settings vary greatly from track to track and moment to moment, but this ensemble is remarkably consistent through it all".

John Fordham of The Guardian mentioned "McBride’s exciting big band is the perfect festival draw – steeped in old-school swing, Latin jazz, funk and Ray Charlesian soul-blues, bristling with hotshot soloists. The opening Gettin’ to It...  is a genial swagger of blues hooks, slyly squealing trumpet-section riffs, and rhythm guitar drive. But after that effusive hello, the leader’s craft and erudition bloom, in the boppishly Byzantine arrangement and pounding bass-walk of Freddie Hubbard’s "Thermo", the bluesiness of Wes Montgomery's "Full House", and the impressionistic, then anthemic, visit to McCoy Tyner’s "Sahara". McBride’s originals are not quite so convincing, and there are a few band-bantering longueurs, but live, this punchy outfit could captivate the traditionalists and jazz hair-shirt wearers, too".

Track listing

Personnel

Christian McBride – bass
Frank Greene – lead trumpet
Freddie Hendrix – trumpet
Brandon Lee – trumpet
Nabate Isles – trumpet
Michael Dease – lead trombone
Steve Davis – trombone ("Optimism")
Joe McDonough – trombone (all tracks except "Optimism")
James Burton – trombone
Douglas Purviance – bass trombone

Steve Wilson – alto, soprano sax, flute
Todd Bashore – alto saxophone, flute, piccolo
Ron Blake – tenor saxophone, flute
Dan Pratt – tenor saxophone, clarinet
Carl Maraghi – baritone saxophone, bass clarinet
Xavier Davis – piano
Rodney Jones – guitar ("Gettin’ to It" & "Full House")
Quincy Phillips – drums
Melissa Walker – vocals ("Upside Down" & "Mr. Bojangles")
Brandee Younger – harp ("In the Wee Small Hours of the Morning")
Anna Webber – album artwork

Chart performance

References

External links
 Christian McBride Discography 

2017 albums
Christian McBride albums
Mack Avenue Records albums
Grammy Award for Best Large Jazz Ensemble Album